Louis Albert (28 May 1898 – 30 January 1951) was a French ski jumper. He competed in the individual event at the 1924 Winter Olympics.

References

External links
 

1898 births
1951 deaths
French male ski jumpers
Olympic ski jumpers of France
Ski jumpers at the 1924 Winter Olympics
Place of birth missing